Neetimati is a rāgam in Carnatic music (musical scale of South Indian classical music). It is the 60th melakarta rāgam (parent scale) in the 72 melakarta rāgam system of Carnatic music. It is called Nishādham in Muthuswami Dikshitar school of Carnatic music.

Structure and Lakshana

It is the 6th rāgam in the 10th chakra Disi. The mnemonic name is Disi-Sha. The mnemonic phrase is sa ri gi mi pa dhu nu. Its  structure (ascending and descending scale) is as follows (see swaras in Carnatic music for details on below notation and terms):
: 
: 
(this scale uses the notes chathusruthi rishabham, sadharana gandharam, prati madhyamam, shatsruthi dhaivatham, kakali nishadham)

As it is a melakarta rāgam, by definition it is a sampoorna rāgam (has all seven notes in ascending and descending scale). It is the prati madhyamam equivalent of Varunapriya, which is the 24th melakarta rāgam.

Janya rāgams 
Neetimati has a few janya rāgams (derived scales) associated with it of which Hamsanadam is quite popular. See List of janya rāgams for full list of scale associated with Neetimati.

Compositions 
A few compositions set to Neetimati are:
Aravinda Lochanane by Ambujam Krishna
Vachamgochara by Thyagaraja
Mohanakara muthu by Koteeswara Iyer
Smaranam by Dr. M. Balamuralikrishna
Sri Tulasi Neetimati by Smt. Kalyani Varadarajan

Related rāgams 
This section covers the theoretical and scientific aspect of this rāgam.

Neetimati's notes when shifted using Graha bhedam, yields 1 minor melakarta rāgam Gangeyabhooshani. Graha bhedam is the step taken in keeping the relative note frequencies same, while shifting the shadjam to the next note in the rāgam. For further details and an illustration refer Graha bhedam on Gangeyabhooshani.

Notes

References

Melakarta ragas